Alex Gerrard may refer to:

Alex Gerrard (rugby league) (born 1991), English rugby league footballer
Alex Gerrard (model), model and wife of footballer Steven Gerrard